Cassiope is a genus of 9-12 small shrubby species in the family Ericaceae. It is the sole genus in the subfamily Cassiopoideae. They are native to the Arctic and north temperate montane regions. The genus is named after Cassiopeia of Greek mythology. Common names, shared with several other similar related genera, include heather and heath. They have scale-like leaves lying against the stems, and produce solitary bell-shaped flowers in late spring. Though hardy, flowers can be damaged by late frosts.

They are cultivated in gardens, suitable sites being rock gardens, peat banks or glades in woodland areas.,

References

External links

Jepson Manual Treatment
USDA Plants Profile

Ericaceae
Ericaceae genera